Diana Dzhigaros (born 2 January 1995) is a Russian judoka.

She is the bronze medallist of the 2019 Judo Grand Slam Abu Dhabi in the -57 kg category.

References

External links
 
 

1995 births
Living people
Russian female judoka
21st-century Russian women